A gubernatorial election was held on 11 April 1971 to elect the Governor of Hokkaido Prefecture.

Candidates
Naohiro Dōgakinai - director of the Hokkaido Research Institute, age 56
 - Vice-Chairman of the Hokkaido Prefectural Assembly and 1967 Hokkaido gubernatorial election candidate, age 52
, age 37

Results

References

Hokkaido gubernational elections
1971 elections in Japan